House snake can refer to three genera:
 Lamprophis
 Dryophylax
 Mesotes